Fire Fighter II is a Robert Allan Ltd. Ranger 4200 class fireboat put in service with Marine Company 9 of the New York City Fire Department (FDNY) on December 7, 2010.   The boat replaces the original Fire Fighter, and is sister to the fireboat Three Forty Three which serves with Marine Company 1.

In  2012, FDNY opened new quarters for Marine 9 at the Staten Island Homeport, a 1,410-foot-long pier in Stapleton that was built in 1980s to berth the Battleship Iowa as part of the former Naval Station New York.

Features

Construction of Fire Fighter II began in December 2008. It incorporates the latest technology available for marine vessels, including the capability of pumping up to 50,000 gallons of water per minute, nearly 30,000 gallons more than its predecessor. There is an operating crew of seven.

See also
 Fireboats of New York City

References 

Fireboats of New York City
2010 ships
Ships built in Panama City, Florida